This article shows the rosters of all participating teams at the men's rugby sevens tournament at the 2018 Commonwealth Games in Gold Coast.

Pool A

South Africa

Scotland

Papua New Guinea

Malaysia

Pool B

England

Australia

Samoa

Jamaica

Pool C

New Zealand

Canada

Kenya

Zambia

Pool D

Fiji

Wales

Uganda

Sri Lanka

References

Commonwealth Games rugby sevens squads